Maikel José Moreno Pérez (born 12 December 1965) is a lawyer, doctor of Venezuelan constitutional law, and judge who currently serves as president of the Supreme Tribunal of Justice of Venezuela.

Moreno is currently a fugitive as part of an investigation by the HSI of U.S. Immigration and Customs Enforcement (ICE). He is the prime suspect and was charged in the United States for crimes against the U.S., money laundering, and engaging in shady financial transactions in property. ICE has publicly announced a $5 million reward for his arrest. Previously, Moreno was incarcerated for murder.

Career and education

DISIP and criminal record

Moreno began his career serving Venezuela by joining the DISIP (now the Bolivarian National Intelligence Service (SEBIN). In 1987, Moreno was indicted for murder in Ciudad Bolívar and imprisoned for two years before being released.

In 1989, he began to work with DISIP once more, serving as a bodyguard for President Carlos Andrés Pérez. Later that year in Caracas, Moreno was allegedly involved in the murder of 19-year-old Rubén Gil Márquez during a brawl in Parque Central. A year later in 1990, Moreno was released due to his connections to DISIP.

Education
Shortly after being released, Moreno attended Universidad Santa María and graduated from their law program in 1995. At this time it is believed that Moreno became acquainted with future First Lady of Venezuela and wife of Nicolás Maduro, Cilia Flores. He would later return to the university and earn a doctorate in Venezuelan law in 2014.

Judge
Under the Hugo Chávez administration, Moreno served as a lower-level judge. Following the 2002 attempted coup d'état that nearly overthrew Chávez, Moreno prosecuted many government opponents between 2002 and 2005. He prosecuted law enforcement leader Iván Simonovis, accusing him of leading the violent acts of the coup attempt which eventually led to the imprisonment of Simonovis.

Moreno also defended in court many of the chavistas involved in the Llaguno Overpass events who fired upon opposition protesters. He also took cases against opposition indidivuals who were accused of being involved in the murder of Danilo Anderson.

Supreme Tribunal Justice 

On 28 December 2014, he was sworn in as magistrate of the Criminal Cassation Chamber of the Supreme Court of Justice by the National Assembly, ratifying the sentence against Leopoldo López during his term. He was also the first vice-president of the Supreme Court and president of the criminal cassation chamber in the plenary session in 2015. He currently holds the presidency of the Supreme Court.

Sanctions 
Moreno has been sanctioned by several countries and is banned from entering neighboring Colombia. The Colombian government maintains a list of people banned from entering Colombia or subject to expulsion; as of January 2019, the list had 200 people with a "close relationship and support for the Nicolás Maduro regime".

The U.S. Treasury Department sanctioned Moreno and seven members of the Venezuelan Supreme Justice Tribunal (TSJ) in May 2017 for usurping the functions of the Venezuelan National Assembly and permitting Maduro to govern by decree. The U.S. assets of the eight individuals were frozen, and U.S. persons prohibited from doing business with them.

Canada sanctioned 40 Venezuelan officials, including Moreno, in September 2017. The sanctions were for behaviors that undermined democracy after at least 125 people will killed in the 2017 Venezuelan protests and "in response to the government of Venezuela's deepening descent into dictatorship".  Canadians were banned from transactions with the 40 individuals, whose Canadian assets were frozen.

The European Union sanctioned seven Venezuela officials, including Moreno, on 18 January 2018, singling them out as being responsible for deteriorating democracy in the country. The sanctioned individuals were prohibited from entering the nations of the European Union, and their assets were frozen.

In March 2018, Panama sanctioned 55 public officials, including Moreno, and Switzerland implemented sanctions, freezing the assets of seven ministers and high officials, including Moreno, due to human rights violations and deteriorating rule of law and democracy.

On 20 April 2018, the Mexican Senate froze the assets of officials of the Maduro administration, including Moreno, and prohibited them from entering Mexico.

On 21 July 2020, the United States imposed sanctions on Moreno and offered a $5 million reward for information leading to his arrest or conviction.

Personal life 
In September 2020 he announced that he had tested positive for COVID-19.

References

Living people
People of the Crisis in Venezuela
Universidad Santa María (Venezuela) alumni
20th-century Venezuelan judges
Supreme Tribunal of Justice (Venezuela)
1965 births
Fugitives wanted by the United States
21st-century Venezuelan judges